The 2010 S.League (officially known as the Great-Eastern-Yeo's S-League for sponsorship reasons) was the 15th season since the establishment of the S-League. The season began on 1 February 2010, and ended on 12 November 2010.

Winners Etoile FC were ineligible to represent Singapore in AFC competitions as they were a foreign team. Tampines Rovers qualified as the runner-up for the 2011 AFC Cup.

Changes from last season
Changes to the league include:
 Etoile FC and Beijing Guoan Talent have replaced DPMM FC and Super Reds FC in the 2010 season.

Teams

List of foreign players
Each club is allowed to have up to a maximum of 4 foreign players.

 Albirex Niigata (S), Beijing Guoan Talent and Etoile FC are not allowed to hire any foreigners.

League table

Top scorers

Results
Fixtures and Results of the S. League 2010 season.

Note:  The results are broken down into weeks rather than rounds, as some teams may play 2 or more games a week due to the nature of the league system (games are played every day). Hence, sometimes, teams may not play in the league some weeks due to other competition commitments or re-arranged games.

<div style="height:400px; overflow-y:auto; margin:0 auto; border:1px solid #BBB" id="fixtures">

Week 1

The opening week of the season runs from Monday 1 February to Friday 5 February. Official Site Weekly Review

Week 2

The 2nd week of the season runs from Monday 8 February to Friday 12 February. Official Site Weekly Review

Week 3

The 3rd week of the season runs from Tuesday 16 February to Friday 19 February. Official Site Weekly Review

Week 4

The 4th week of the season runs from Monday 8 March to Friday 12 March. Official Site Weekly Review

Week 5

The 5th week of the season runs from Sunday 14 March to Friday 19 March. Official Site Weekly Review

Week 6

The 6th week of the season runs from Monday 22 March to Saturday 27 March. Official Site Weekly Review

Week 7

The 7th week of the season runs from Monday 29 March to Friday 2 April. Official Site Weekly Review

Week 8

The 8th week of the season runs from Monday 5 April to Saturday 10 April. Official Site Weekly Review

Week 9

The 9th week of the season runs from Monday 12 April to Friday 16 April. Official Site Weekly Review

Week 10

The 10th week of the season runs from Monday 19 April to Saturday 24 April. Official Site Weekly Review

Week 11

The 11th week of the season runs from Monday 26 April to Friday 30 April. Official Site Weekly Review

Week 12

The 12th week of the season runs from Monday 3 May to Saturday 8 May. Official Site Weekly Review

Week 13

The 13th week of the season runs from Monday 10 May to Saturday 15 May. Official Site Weekly Review

Week 14

The 14th week of the season runs from Monday 17 May to Saturday 22 May. Official Site Weekly Review

Week 15

The 15th week of the season runs from Tuesday 1 June to Sunday 6 June. Official Site Weekly Review

Week 16

The 16th week of the season runs from Monday 7 June to Friday 11 June. Official Site Weekly Review

Week 17

The 17th week of the season runs from Sunday 13 June to Saturday 19 June. Official Site Weekly Review

Week 18

The 18th week of the season runs from Monday 21 June to Saturday 26 June. Official Site Weekly Review

Week 19

The 19th week of the season runs from Monday 28 June to Sunday 4 July. Official Site Weekly Review

Week 20

The 20th week of the season runs from Monday 5 July to Friday 9 July. Official Site Weekly Review

Week 21

The 21st week of the season runs from Monday 12 July to Sunday 18 July. Official Site Weekly Review

Week 22

The 22nd week of the season runs from Monday 19 July to Sunday 25 July.Official Site Weekly Review

Week 23

The 23rd week of the season runs from Monday 26 July to Sunday 1 August. Official Site Weekly Review

Week 24

The 24th week of the season runs from Monday 2 August to Sunday 8 August. Official Site Review

Week 25

The 25th week of the season runs from Monday 30 August to Sunday 5 September. Official Site Weekly Review

Week 26

The 26th week of the season runs from Monday 6 September to Wednesday 8 September. Official Site Weekly Review

Week 27

The 27th week of the season runs from Monday 13 September to Friday 17 September. Official Site Weekly Review

Week 28

The 28th week of the season runs from Tuesday 21 September to Friday 24 September. Official Site Weekly Review

Week 29

The 29th week of the season runs from Monday 27 September to Wednesday 29 September. Official Site Weekly Review

Week 30

The 30th week of the season runs from Monday 4 October to Thursday 7 October. Official Site Weekly Review

Week 31

The 31st week of the season runs from Monday 11 October to Thursday 14 October. Official Site Weekly Review

Week 32

The 32nd week of the season runs from Monday 18 October to Sunday 24 October. Official Site Weekly Review

Week 33

The 33rd week of the season will be played on Tuesday 26 October.

Week 34

The 34th week of the season will be played on Wednesday 3 November.

Week 35

The 35th week of the season will be played from Wednesday 10 November to Friday 12 November.

Stadia and attendance

Stadia

 All Friday matches, televised live on MediaCorp Channel 5, are played at the Jalan Besar Stadium. However, the time period of the 2010 Youth Olympic Games will see matches being played at the home stadium of the respective home team.

See also
 2010 Singapore Cup
 2010 Singapore League Cup

Notes and references

External links
 Official site
 2010 S.League scores

Singapore Premier League seasons
1
Sing
Sing